Fredson Vinícius Santos Oliveira (born November 30, 1991 in Arauá), or simply Fredson, is a Brazilian footballer. He currently plays for Ferroviário.

Honours

Sampaio Corrêa
Campeonato Maranhense: 2017
Copa do Nordeste: 2018

Remo
Campeonato Paraense: 2019
Copa Verde: 2021

References

External links
 Fredson at playmakerstats.com (English version of ogol.com.br)
 

1991 births
Living people
Brazilian footballers
Sampaio Corrêa Futebol Clube players
Clube do Remo players
Horizonte Futebol Clube players
Association football defenders